A referendum was held in French Cameroons on 21 October 1945 as part of the wider French constitutional referendum. 

Both referendum questions were approved by large margins. Voter turnout was 71.1%.

Results

Question I

Question II

References

1945 referendums
October 1945 events in Africa
1945
1945 in French Cameroon
Constitutional referendums in France